Nicolò Buratti (born 7 July 2001) is an Italian cyclist, who currently rides for UCI Continental team .

Buratti will join UCI WorldTeam  from 2024.

Major results
2022
 1st GP Capodarco
 1st Gran Premio Sportivi di Poggiana
 2nd Overall Giro della Regione Friuli Venezia Giulia
1st Points classification
1st Stages 1 (TTT) & 4
 3rd GP Slovenian Istria
 7th Road race, UEC European Under-23 Road Championships
 8th Overall Carpathian Couriers Race
1st Prologue
 8th Trofeo Città di Brescia

References

External links

2001 births
Living people
Italian male cyclists